Konch is a city and a municipal board in Jalaun district in the Indian state of Uttar Pradesh.

With its history going back to the Ramayan era, this place has also been described in Vedas as a place famous for the presence of a number of Kronch birds.

It has India's shortest broad-gauge railway line between Konch and Ait, known as the Ait-Konch Shuttle.  It is approximately 29 km from the city of Orai, where the headquarters of the district is situated.

Demographics 
 India census, Konch had a population of around 257,874. Males constitute 53% of the population and females 47%. Konch has an average literacy rate of 65%, more than the national average of 59.5%: male literacy is 70%, and female literacy is 60%. In Konch, 15% of the population is under 6 years of age.

Famous events 
Konch city is famous for the Tapobhoomi of kronch rishi, oldest Ramlila, and moving Dussehra celebration.

The Ramlila play is 160 years old and also has its name in Limca book of world records.

Notable people

Konch City has some famous personalities like Minister Of State Ministry of Micro, Small and Medium Enterprises Shri Bhanu Pratap Singh Verma.

Location 
Konch town Is located near Madhya Pradesh border approx distance from Nadigaon town an Madhya Pradesh Border is 20 and 23km approx. respectively. Ravatpura temple is one of the attractions near Konch town and is nearly 25km from Konch town. The Konch city is divided into 25 wards. Hotel Ashirwad Konch also attracts many people to Konch for business meetings and celebrations.

How to reach 
Via Rail – You can book tickets to Orai or Ait.

Via Air – Lucknow airport or Kanpur airport or Gwalior Airport are some airports near Konch.

Via Road – Buses from all over the country are available to Orai then you may have to change bus to Konch or private taxis are also available.

References 

Cities and towns in Jalaun district